Dead in the Boot is a B-sides compilation album by English rock band Elbow, released in the UK on 27 August 2012. The title is a reference to the band's debut album Asleep in the Back and was suggested by singer Guy Garvey's sister Beckie.

Reception

The reviews for the album were mostly positive, with many reviewers commenting on the overall downbeat nature of the songs. NME noted that "there is a strain of nocturnal lethargy that seems to run through Elbow's flipsides... it's odd that its somnolent air actually renders it slightly one-note... But there's nothing wrong with a gentle head massage after a hard night." The Daily Telegraph described the tracks as "mostly steady, lo-fi grooves, propelled by blue-collar bluesy riffs, detached electronic bleeps and mournful pianos", and stated that "in the best possible sense, these songs are come-downs, reflective descents from the band's often soaring, more melody-driven A-sides. They may have been left in the band's boot for a while, but there's nothing dead about them." Mojo called it "an accomplished compilation" and proclaimed that "Dead in the Boot is less throwaway than its name suggests."

BBC Music said "This is more than just a stopgap between the albums, and while not exactly standing alongside their best in terms of outright quality, shows that even Elbow's 'hidden' past is worthy of deeper exploration." The Independent had some criticisms, saying that the album was "far from exhaustive, with tracks cherry-picked for quality and sequenced non-chronologically. Indeed, if anything, there's a touch too many of the tender piano ostinatos", but overall opining that "most B-sides compilations seem to have been thrown together to fulfil contracts but Dead in the Boot has a form and substance beyond that".

Track listing

Personnel
Elbow
Guy Garvey – vocals, slide guitar on "The Long War Shuffle", string, percussion, brass & choral arrangements
Mark Potter – guitars
Craig Potter – keys, percussion
Pete Turner – bass
Richard Jupp – drums, percussion

Release history

References

2012 albums
Elbow (band) albums
B-side compilation albums
Fiction Records albums